Cristián Alexander Zavala Briones (born 3 August 1999) is a Chilean professional footballer who plays as a forward for Chilean Primera División side Curicó Unido on loan from Colo-Colo.

Career

At the age of 15, Zavala left the youth academy of Colo-Colo, Chile's most successful team. On 2018, he made his professional debut playing for Coquimbo Unido at the Primera B in a match against Santiago Wanderers. 

For the 2020 season, he was sent on loan to Fernández Vial in the Chilean Segunda División from top flight side Coquimbo Unido., but he came back to Coquimbo on November of the same year. 

On 2021 season, he joined Deportes Melipilla.

International career
Zavala made his debut for the Chile national team on 9 December 2021 in a 2–2 draw against Mexico.

Honours
Coquimbo Unido
Primera B (1): 2018

References

External links
 

Living people
1999 births
Chilean footballers
Association football defenders
Coquimbo Unido footballers
C.D. Arturo Fernández Vial footballers
Deportes Melipilla footballers
Colo-Colo footballers
Chilean Primera División players
Primera B de Chile players
Segunda División Profesional de Chile players
People from Puente Alto